Pandora and the Flying Dutchman is a 1951 British Technicolor romantic fantasy drama film directed by Albert Lewin and produced by Lewin and Joseph Kaufman from Lewin's own screenplay, based on the legend of the Flying Dutchman. It was filmed mainly in Tossa de Mar, on the Costa Brava in Catalonia, Spain. The land record speed scenes were shot at Pendine Sands in Wales.

The film stars James Mason and Ava Gardner, with Nigel Patrick, Sheila Sim, Harold Warrender, Mario Cabré and Marius Goring in supporting roles. In Tossa de Mar, a statue of Gardner was erected in 1996 on the hill overlooking the town's main beach.

In the United States, Metro-Goldwyn-Mayer (MGM) delayed its release until Gardner's star-making performance in Show Boat (1951) could be seen.  The tactic worked, and this film solidified her status as a rapidly rising star.

The film is mostly spoken in English, but some characters speak Catalan (the local fishermen at the beginning of the film) and Spanish (the bullfighter's entourage).

Artist Man Ray, who was a friend of Albert Lewin, produced some sets for Pandora. He created particular cubist-style chess pieces and several paintings seen in the film, notably the main one, a sort of surreal scene in the De Chirico fashion.

Plot
In autumn 1930, fishermen in the fictitious small Spanish port of Esperanza make a grim discovery in their nets, the bodies of a man and a woman. The resultant ringing of church bells in the village brings the local police and the resident archaeologist, Geoffrey Fielding (Harold Warrender), to the beach. Fielding returns to his villa, and, breaking the "fourth wall", retells the story of these two people to the audience.

Esperanza's small group of English expatriates revolves around Pandora Reynolds (Ava Gardner), an alluring American nightclub singer and femme fatale. All the men love her (or believe that they do), but Pandora is unable to love anyone. One of her admirers Reggie Demarest (Marius Goring) commits suicide in front of Pandora and her friends by drinking wine that he has laced with poison, but Pandora shows indifference and later comments that she is relieved by his death.

She tests her admirers by demanding they give up something they value. Pandora agrees to marry a land-speed record holder, Stephen Cameron (Nigel Patrick), after he sends his racing car tumbling into the sea at her request.  That same night, the Dutch captain Hendrik van der Zee (James Mason) arrives in Esperanza. Pandora swims out to his yacht and finds him painting a picture of her posed as her namesake, Pandora, whose actions brought an end to the earthly paradise in Greek mythology. Hendrik appears to fall in love with Pandora, and he moves into the same hotel complex as the other expatriates.

Geoffrey and Hendrik become friends, collaborating to seek background information on Geoffrey's local finds. One of these relics is a notebook written in Old Dutch, which confirms Geoffrey's suspicion that Hendrik van der Zee is the Flying Dutchman, a 16th-century ship captain who murdered his wife, believing her to be unfaithful. He blasphemed against God at his murder trial, where he was sentenced to death.

The evening before his execution, a mysterious force opened the Dutchman's prison doors and allowed him to escape to his waiting ship, where in a dream it was revealed to him that his wife was innocent and he was doomed to sail the seas for eternity unless he could find a woman who loved him enough to die for him. Every seven years, the Dutchman could go ashore for six months to search for that woman.

Despite her impending wedding to Stephen, Pandora declares her love for Hendrik, but he is unwilling to have her die for his sake, and tries to provoke her into hating him.

Pandora is also loved by Juan Montalvo (Mario Cabré), an arrogant, famous bullfighter, who murders Hendrik out of jealousy. But as soon as Montalvo leaves, Hendrik comes back to life as if nothing had happened. He attends the bullfight the next day, and when Montalvo sees him in the audience, he becomes petrified with fear and is fatally gored by the bull. Before dying, Montalvo tells Pandora about his murder of his romantic rival, leaving her confused.

On the eve of her wedding, Pandora asks Geoffrey if he knows anything about Hendrik that will clear up her confusion. Once he sees the Flying Dutchman preparing to sail away, he hands her his translation of the notebook. However, the Dutchman's yacht is becalmed. On learning the truth, Pandora swims out to Hendrik again. He shows her a small portrait of his murdered wife. She and Pandora look exactly alike. Hendrik explains they are man and wife and that through her he has been given the chance to escape his doom, but he rejected it because it would cost her death. Pandora is undaunted, however. That night, there is a fierce storm at sea. The next morning, the bodies of Pandora and the Dutchman are recovered.

Cast

Reception

According to MGM records, Pandora and the Flying Dutchman earned $1,247,000 in the US and Canada and $354,000 elsewhere.

The film was one of the most popular films at the British box office 1951.

It holds a rating of 67% on Rotten Tomatoes based on 33 reviews.

Comic book adaptation
 Eastern Color Movie Love #11 (October 1951)

References

External links
 
 
 
 
 Posters and stills from the film

1951 films
1951 romantic drama films
1950s fantasy drama films
1950s mystery drama films
1950s romantic fantasy films
Films set in 1930
British fantasy drama films
British mystery drama films
British romantic drama films
British romantic fantasy films
Bullfighting films
Films adapted into comics
Films directed by Albert Lewin
Films set in the Mediterranean Sea
Films shot in Spain
Flying Dutchman
1950s English-language films
1950s British films